The Sixth Australian Recording Industry Association Music Awards (generally known as the ARIA Music Awards or simply The ARIAS) was held on 6 March 1992 at the World Congress Centre in Melbourne. Hosts were international guest, Julian Lennon and local Richard Wilkins, they were assisted by presenters, Spinal Tap, Rod Stewart, Mick Jones and others to distribute 24 awards. There were live performances and for the first time the awards were televised.

In addition to previous categories, a "Special Achievement Award" was presented to entrepreneur Michael Gudinski and his label Mushroom Records. The ARIA Hall of Fame inducted only one act: Skyhooks.

Presenters and performers 

The ARIA Awards ceremony was co-hosted by singer-songwriter Julian Lennon and TV personality Richard Wilkins. Presenters and performers were:

Awards

Nominees for most awards are shown in plain, with winners in bold.

ARIA Awards

Album of the Year 
Baby Animals – Baby Animals
Jimmy Barnes – Soul Deep
Deborah Conway – String of Pearls
Crowded House – Woodface
Died Pretty – Doughboy Hollow
Single of the Year 
Yothu Yindi – "Treaty (Filthy Lucre Remix)"
Baby Animals – "Early Warning"
Jimmy Barnes & John Farnham – "When Something Is Wrong with My Baby"
Daryl Braithwaite – "The Horses"
Deborah Conway – "It's Only the Beginning"
Highest Selling Album 
Jimmy Barnes – Soul Deep
Cold Chisel – Chisel
Crowded House – Woodface
Ratcat – Blind Love
Noiseworks – Love Versus Money
John Farnham – Full House
Highest Selling Single 
Melissa – "Read My Lips"
Daryl Braithwaite – "The Horses"
Jimmy Barnes & John Farnham – "When Something Is Wrong with My Baby"
Screaming Jets – "Better"
Jenny Morris – "Break in the Weather"
Best Group
INXS – Live Baby Live
Baby Animals – Baby Animals
Black Sorrows – "Never Let Me Go"
Crowded House – Woodface
Hunters & Collectors – "Where Do You Go?"
Best Female Artist 
Deborah Conway – String of Pearls
Kate Ceberano – Think About It!
Kylie Minogue – Let's Get to It
Wendy Matthews – "Let's Kiss (Like Angels Do)"
Jenny Morris – Honeychild
Best Male Artist
Jimmy Barnes – Soul Deep
Daryl Braithwaite – "The Horses"
Tommy Emmanuel – Determination
John Farnham – Full House
Richard Pleasance – Galleon
Best New Talent 
Underground Lovers – Underground Lovers
Degenerates – Out of My Head
Euphoria – "Love You Right"
Melissa – "Read My Lips"
Jo Beth Taylor – "99 Reasons"
Breakthrough Artist – Album
Baby Animals – Baby Animals
Clouds – Penny Century
Deborah Conway – String of Pearls
Ratcat – Blind Love
Richard Pleasance – Galleon
Breakthrough Artist – Single
Baby Animals – "Early Warning"
Deborah Conway – "It's Only the Beginning"
Maybe Dolls – "Nervous Kid"
Troy Newman – "Love Gets Rough"
Richard Pleasance – "Sarah (I Miss You)"
Best Country Album 
Anne Kirkpatrick – Out of the Blue
James Blundell – "Time on His Hands"
Graeme Connors – Tropicali
Keith Urban – "Only You"
John Williamson – Waratah St
Best Independent Release 
Not Drowning, Waving – Proof
The Aints – Ascension
Def FX – Water
Ed Kuepper – Honey Steel's Gold
Underground Lovers – Underground Lovers
Best Indigenous Release 
Yothu Yindi – Tribal Voice
Archie Roach – "Down City Streets"
Kev Carmody – Eulogy (For a Black Person)
Shane Howard – "Escape from Reality"
Not Drowning, Waving & The Musicians of Rabaul, Papua New Guinea featuring George Telek – Tabaran
Best Adult Contemporary Album 
Tommy Emmanuel – Determination
Debbie Byrne – Caught in the Act
Grace Knight – Stormy Weather
Monica & the Moochers – Cotton on the Breeze
John Williamson – Waratah St
Best Comedy Release 
John Clarke & Bryan Dawe – The Annual Report
Agro – Agro Too
Rodney Rude – A Legend
Rubbery Figures – "Recession Rap"
Kevin Bloody Wilson – Let's Call Him Kev

Fine Arts Awards
Best Jazz Album 
Dale Barlow – Hipnotation
James Morrison – Manner Dangerous
Mike Nock Quartet – Dark and Curious
Carl Orr – Seeking Spirit
Ten Part Invention – Ten Part Invention
Best Classical Album 
Stuart Challender, Sydney Symphony Orchestra – Vine: 3 Symphonies
Australian Ensemble – Cafe Concertino
The Australian Opera – Mozart Arias & Scenes
Geoffrey Lancaster – Fortepiano
Roger Woodward – Prokofiev Piano Works
Best Children's Album 
Peter Combe – The Absolutely Very Best of Peter Combe (So Far) Recorded in Concert
Agro – Agro Too
Ruth Cracknell – Paul Gallico's The Snow Goose
Noni Hazlehurst – Noni Sings Day and Night Songs and Rhymes from Play School
Franciscus Henri – Dancing in the Kitchen
Best Original Soundtrack / Cast / Show Recording 
Mario Millo – Brides of Christ
Jan Castor – Red Express
Not Drowning, Waving – Proof Soundtrack
Original Australian Cast – Return to the Forbidden Planet
Original Motion Picture Soundtrack for Philip Judd – Death in Brunswick

Artisan Awards
Song of the Year
Mandawuy Yunupingu, Gurrumul Yunupingu, Milkayngu Mununggurr, Stuart Kellaway, Paul Kelly, Cal Williams – Yothu Yindi – "Treaty"
Phil Buckle – Southern Sons – "Hold Me in Your Arms"
Suze DeMarchi, Eddie Parise, Dave Leslie – Baby Animals – "Early Warning"
Deborah Conway, Scott Cutler – Deborah Conway – "It's Only the Beginning"
Neil Finn – Crowded House – "Fall at Your Feet"
Producer of the Year
Simon Hussey – Craig McLachlan – "On My Own"; Daryl Braithwaite – "The Horses", "Higher than Hope", "Don't Hold Back Your Love"; James Reyne – "Slave"
Mark Moffatt, Gavin Campbell, Robert Goodge, Paul Main – Yothu Yindi – "Treaty (Filthy Lucre Remix)"
Nick Mainsbridge – Def FX – "Water"; – Ratcat – "Blind Love Don't Go Now"; – Tall Tales and True – "Lifeboat"
Richard Pleasance – Richard Pleasance – "Don't Cry"; Deborah Conway – "It's Only the Beginning", "Release Me", "White Roses"
Ross Fraser – Southern Sons – "Hold Me in Your Arms"; John Farnham – "In Days to Come", "That's Freedom"
Engineer of the Year 
David Price, Ted Howard, Greg Henderson, Simon Polinski – Yothu Yindi – "Maralitja", "Dharpa", "Treaty", "Treaty (Filthy Lucre Remix)", "Tribal Voice"
Peter Cobbin – Grace Knight – "Crazy", "Fever", "Stormy Weather", "That Ole Devil Called Love"
Paul Kosky – Crowded House – "Chocolate Cake", "Woodface"
Nick Mainsbridge – Def FX – "Water"; – Ratcat – "Blind Love Don't Go Now"; – Tall Tales and True – "Lifeboat"
Doug Roberts – Deborah Conway – "Release Me", "White Roses", "Someday"
Best Video 
John Hillcoat – Crowded House – "Chocolate Cake"
Paul Elliott – Boom Crash Opera – "Holywater"
Stephen Johnson – Yothu Yindi – "Treaty (Filthy Lucre Remix)"
Marcel Lunam – Died Pretty – "D.C."
Brendon Young – Tall Tales and True – "Lifeboat"
Best Cover Art 
Louise Beach, Mushroom Art – Yothu Yindi – Tribal Voice
Pierre Baroni, Mushroom Art – Jimmy Barnes – Soul Deep
Pierre Baroni, Mushroom Art – Deborah Conway – String of Pearls
Richard Pleasance, Ross Hipwell – Richard Pleasance – Galleon
Tommy Steele, Nick Seymour – Crowded House – Woodface

Special Achievement Award
Michael Gudinski & Mushroom Records

ARIA Hall of Fame inductee
The Hall of Fame inductee was:
Skyhooks

References

External links
ARIA Awards official website
List of 1992 winners

1992 music awards
1992 in Australian music
ARIA Music Awards